Bučina may refer to places in the Czech Republic:

Bučina (Ústí nad Orlicí District), a municipality and village in the Pardubice Region
Bučina, an extinct village and administrative part of Kvilda in the South Bohemian Region
Bučina a hamlet and administrative part of Vranov (Benešov District) in the Central Bohemian Region